The Celtic Trail is a network of dedicated cycle routes in the National Cycle Network, crossing West, South and Mid Wales, and covering 377 miles in total. It is divided into east and west sections. The west section links Pembroke and Fishguard on the west coast to Swansea, and the east section covers the area from Swansea to Chepstow, Abergavenny and Hay-on-Wye in the east. It is largely traffic free but sections along the route are still being upgraded and improved. In some places there is a choice of a low-level route, or a high-level route for mountain bikes.

The network includes Route 42 (Glasbury, Mid Wales to Gloucester, England), Route 43 (Swansea to Builth Wells), Route 46 (Hereford to Newport), Route 47 (Newport to Fishguard), Route 49 (Abergavenny to Newport), and 492 (Cwmbran to Brynmawr), the Welsh section of Route 4 (London to Fishguard), a large part of Route 8 (Lon las Cymru, Cardiff to Holyhead), and other short links.

Places along Route 47 (from west to east) include:
Fishguard
Pembrokeshire Coast National Park
National Botanic Garden of Wales
Carmarthen
Pembrey Country Park (Millennium Coastal Path)
Llanelli
Swansea
Neath
Pontypridd
Merthyr Tydfil
Caerphilly
Newport
Chepstow
Severn Bridge

Further reading
 Penn, Robert (2008). The Celtic Trail: The Official Guide to National Cycle Network Routes 4 and 47 from Fishguard to Chepstow. Pocket Mountains Ltd.

External links
 Sustrans map and description - east section
 Sustrans map and description - west section
 Sustrans Routes2Ride: Cycling the Celtic Trail
 Celtic Trail Project
 Cycling Wales
 Wales Trails
 UK Cycle Map: Map of Celtic Trail

Cycleways in Wales
National Cycle Routes

Transport in Pembrokeshire
Transport in Carmarthenshire
Transport in Swansea
Transport in Neath Port Talbot
Transport in Bridgend County Borough
Transport in Rhondda Cynon Taf
Transport in Caerphilly County Borough
Transport in Newport, Wales
Transport in Monmouthshire
Transport in Torfaen
Transport in Merthyr Tydfil
Cycleways in Powys